Criollo or criolla (Spanish for creole) may refer to:

People
 Criollo people, a social class in the Spanish colonial system.

Animals
 Criollo duck, a species of duck native to Central and South America.
 Criollo cattle, a group of cattle breeds descended from Spanish stock imported to the Americas
 Argentine Criollo cattle, one of these breeds
 Raramuri Criollo cattle, another such breed
 Criollo horse, a South American horse breed
 Criollo sheep, a breed of domestic sheep originating in the highlands of South and Central America
 Cuban Criollo horse, a horse breed from Cuba

Food and plants
 Avocado criollo, the native undomesticated variety of avocado (Persea americana) as found in Mexico
 Criollo cheese, a Mexican grating cheese
 Criollo (cocoa bean), a cocoa bean cultivar from Chuao, Venezuela
 Criolla (grape), a group of grape varieties
 List of mango cultivars, or Mango criollo, a mango cultivar originating from Ecuador
 Pabellón criollo, a traditional Venezuelan dish
 Pique criollo, a hot condiment used in Puerto Rican cooking
 Criollo (chocolate), a rare and expensive variety of chocolate

Music
 Criolla, a genre of Cuban music
 Música criolla, a genre of Peruvian music combining mainly African, Spanish and Andean influences
 Criollo (band), Canadian band
 Criolo (born 1975), Brazilian singer and rapper
 Los Troveros Criollos, música criolla band from Peru

Other
 Criollo tobacco, a type of tobacco originated in Cuba and used for cigar wrappers 
 Criollos de Caguas (disambiguation)
 El Fausto criollo, a 1979 Argentine film directed by Luis Saslavsky
 Monte Criollo, a 1935 Argentine musical film directed and written by Arturo S. Mom
 Criollismo, Latin American literary movement
 Fútbol criollo, a style of playing football associated with Argentina
 Viveza criolla, an aspect of Argentine mentality

See also
 Creole (disambiguation)